Che with hook (Ч̡ ч̡; italics: Ч̡ ч̡) is a letter of the Cyrillic script used in the Surgut dialect of Khanty and in the Tofa language.

Use 
In Surgut Khanty, the che with hook is sometimes used in place of che with descender (Ҷ, ҷ).

Forms and variants

Sources

References 

Cyrillic letters with diacritics
Letters with hook
Unencoded Cyrillic letters